Neelambari is 2001 Indian Kannada-language fantasy film directed by Surya and starring Ramya Krishna, Suman, Charulatha and Vinod Alva.

Cast 

Ramya Krishna as Malli / Akhila Sriram (renamed with Neelambari's soul inside her) / Goddess Durga
Suman as Veera
Charulatha as Neela
Vinod Alva as Vinod
Devaraj 
Prema

Ranganath as Neelambari's father
Charuhasan as old man
Tara
Michael Madhu

Reception 
A critic from Sify said that "What can you say more about this super natural movie mixed with special effects? Well if you like Ramyakrishnan, go for it". Gudipoodi Srihari of The Hindu wrote that "The narration drags, taking good time to present the obvious. The film belongs to Ramyakrishna who plays different characters that come into picture at different stages". Arpan Panicker of Full Hyderabad opined that "It ain't different enough, and if Ramya Krishna doesn't start fighting that bulge and continues with those ambitious dance steps, the Richter scale isn't gonna be enough either".

References

External links 

2001 films
2000s Kannada-language films
Indian fantasy films
2000s supernatural films